Shunsaku (written: 俊作) is a masculine Japanese given name. Notable people with the name include:

 (1901–1979), Imperial Japanese Navy officer
 (born 1971), Japanese musician

Japanese masculine given names